Armah or Aṣḥamah, commonly known as Najashi, was the ruler of the Kingdom of Aksum who reigned from 614–631 CE. He is primarily known through the coins that were minted during his reign. It is agreed by Islamic scholars that Najashi gave shelter to the Muslim emigrants around 615–616 at Axum.

Kingship 
Najashi reigned for 18 years from 614–631 CE. During his reign, Muslims migrated to Abyssinia and met Najashi. According to Islamic sources, Jafar ibn Abi Talib told Najashi about the persecution they had faced at the hands of the Quraysh. Najashi asked if they had with them anything which had come from God. Ja‘far then recited a passage from Surah Maryam. When the Najashi heard it, he wept and exclaimed:
Najashi then affirmed that he would never give up the Muslims. Scholar of ancient Ethiopia, Stuart Munro-Hay (1947–2004), stated that either Armah or Gersem was the last Axumite king to issue coins. Bronze coins from the reign of Armah depict him as a full-length figure enthroned, with Christian cross motifs throughout.

Personal life 
Najashi was raised as a Christian. Traditional Muslim sources indicate that the Islamic prophet Muhammad prayed an absentee funeral prayer in Madinah which is performed upon a dead Muslim if they die in a place with no Muslims to pray for the dead.

Artifacts 
Armah's silver coins have an unusual reverse, showing a structure with three crosses, the middle one gilded. Munro-Hay quotes W.R.O. Hahn as suggesting that this is an allusion to the Holy Sepulchre, as a reference to the Persian capture of Jerusalem in 614.

See also 
 Saifu

References

External links 
 Muslim Emigrants & Quraysh in Courtroom of Negus (The Message Movie Scene) (YouTube)
 Ethiopian Christian King saves Muslim Captives

Kings of Axum
Ethiopian Christians
7th-century monarchs in Africa
Christian and Islamic interfaith dialogue
Hijrah
631 deaths